Mirosław Żerkowski (born 20 August 1956 in Łódź) is a retired Polish middle- and long-distance runner. He represented his country at the 1980 Summer Olympics as well as one outdoor and one indoor World Championships. In addition, he won a bronze medal at the 1981 European Indoor Championships.

International competitions

Personal bests
Outdoor
800 metres – 1:48.01 (Auckland 1981)
1000 metres – 2:19.30 (Białystok 1981)
1500 metres – 3:36.19 (Warsaw 1980)
One mile – 3:56.63 (London 1982)
3000 metres – 7:48.93 (Rhede 1990)
5000 metres – 13:34.24 (Saarijärvi 1989)
10,000 metres – 28:45.35 (Białystok 1993)
Half marathon – 1:05:00 (Brussels 1993)
Marathon – 2:18.24 (New York 1996)
2000 metres steeplechase – 5:22.32 (Formia 1991)
3000 metres steeplechase – 8:16.89 (Berlin 1990)
Indoor
800 metres – 1:48.87 (Budapest 1984)
1500 metres – 3:41.16 (Stuttgart 1985)

References

All-Athletics profile

1956 births
Living people
Sportspeople from Łódź
Polish male middle-distance runners
Polish male steeplechase runners
Polish male long-distance runners
Athletes (track and field) at the 1980 Summer Olympics
Olympic athletes of Poland
World Athletics Championships athletes for Poland